Sir William McNair Snadden, 1st Baronet JP (15 January 1896 – 23 November 1959) was a Scottish Tory politician.

The youngest son of the Reverend James Snadden, the young Snadden was educated at Dollar Academy. In 1915, early in the Great War, he was commissioned into the Argyll and Sutherland Highlanders and served with the British Expeditionary Force in France between 1915 and 1917.

Snadden was elected as the Unionist Member of Parliament for Kinross and West Perthshire at a by-election in 1938, following the resignation of Katharine Marjory Stewart-Murray, Duchess of Atholl, who had left the Scottish Unionist Party in protest against the National government's European policy, and who stood again as an Independent; regaining the seat only narrowly, Snadden held it until he stood down at the 1955 general election. He was joint Parliamentary Under-Secretary of State for Scotland from 1951 to 1955.

He was Chairman of the Scottish Food Hygiene Council, President of the Smithfield Club, and President of the Scottish Unionist Association. He was a keen farmer and stock breeder in Perthshire.

On his retirement he was created a baronet. The baronetcy became extinct on his death.

References

External links 
 

1896 births
1959 deaths
Argyll and Sutherland Highlanders officers
Baronets in the Baronetage of the United Kingdom
British Army personnel of World War I
Members of the Parliament of the United Kingdom for Scottish constituencies
People educated at Dollar Academy
UK MPs 1935–1945
UK MPs 1945–1950
UK MPs 1950–1951
UK MPs 1951–1955
Unionist Party (Scotland) MPs
Ministers in the third Churchill government, 1951–1955
Ministers in the Eden government, 1955–1957